or Japanese foot is a Japanese unit of length derived (but varying) from the Chinese , originally based upon the distance measured by a human hand from the tip of the thumb to the tip of the forefinger (compare span).

Etymology in English

Use in Japan
The  had been standardized as  since 1891. This means that there are 3.3  to one meter.

The use of the unit for official purposes in Japan was banned on March 31 1966, although it is still used in traditional Japanese carpentry and some other fields, such as kimono construction. Similarly, the  remains in use in the Japanese lumber trade.

In Japanese media parlance,  refers to screen time: the amount of time someone or something is shown on screen (similar to the English "footage").

History
Traditionally, the actual length of the  varied over time, location, and use.

Carpenter's unit and tailor's unit

Derived units

Length

Volume

Outside Japan 
The Japanese  also forms the basis of the modern Taiwanese foot.

See also
 Japanese units of measurement

Notes

References

Bibliography
 

Japanese words and phrases
Units of length